Fangs of the Arctic is a 1953 American Northern film directed by Rex Bailey and starring Kirby Grant, Lorna Hanson and Warren Douglas. The film was the eighth in the series of ten films featuring Kirby Grant as a Canadian Mountie.

Cast
 Kirby Grant as RCMP Corporal Rod Webb 
 Lorna Hanson as Sandra Dubois  
 Warren Douglas as Matt Oliver 
 Leonard Penn as Henchman Morgan  
 Richard Avonde as Henchman Cheval  
 Robert Sherman as RCMP Constable Mike Kelly  
 John Close as Henchman Howell  
 Phil Tead as MacGregor, Trading Post Owner  
 Roy Gordon as Briggs 
 Kit Carson (actor) as Andrews
 Chinook as Chinook, Webb's dog

See also
 Trail of the Yukon (1949)
 The Wolf Hunters (1949)
 Snow Dog (1950)
 Call of the Klondike (1950)
 Northwest Territory (1951)
 Yukon Manhunt (1951)
 Yukon Gold (1952)
 Northern Patrol (1953)
 Yukon Vengeance (1954)

References

Bibliography
 Drew, Bernard. Motion Picture Series and Sequels: A Reference Guide. Routledge, 2013.

External links
 

1953 films
1953 Western (genre) films
Allied Artists films
American Western (genre) films
American black-and-white films
Corporal Rod Webb (film series)
Films based on American novels
Films based on works by James Oliver Curwood
Films directed by Rex Bailey
Films produced by Lindsley Parsons
Films with screenplays by Warren Douglas
Northern (genre) films
Royal Canadian Mounted Police in fiction
1950s English-language films
1950s American films